Albert Teruel (born 3 April 1987 in Barcelona) is a Spanish professional basketball player who played for CB Girona.

References

External links

Spanish men's basketball players
CB Girona players
Small forwards
Living people
1987 births
People from Barcelona
21st-century Spanish people